Pablo Despósito (born January 30, 1989 in Buenos Aires, Argentina) is an Argentine footballer currently playing for Almirante Brown of the Primera B Metropolitana in Argentine.

Teams
  Vélez Sársfield 2008–2010
  Tristán Suárez 2010–2011
  Independiente Medellín 2011
  Independiente (Campo Grande) 2012
  Tristán Suárez 2012–2013
  Atlético Tucumán 2013–present

References
 Profile at BDFA 
 

1989 births
Living people
Argentine footballers
Argentine expatriate footballers
Club Atlético Vélez Sarsfield footballers
CSyD Tristán Suárez footballers
Independiente Medellín footballers
Independiente F.B.C. footballers
Atlético Tucumán footballers
Club Almirante Brown footballers
Categoría Primera A players
Primera B Metropolitana players
Expatriate footballers in Colombia
Expatriate footballers in Paraguay
Association football midfielders
Footballers from Buenos Aires